Foreskin restoration is the process of expanding the skin on the penis to reconstruct an organ similar to the foreskin, which has been removed by circumcision or injury.  Foreskin restoration is primarily accomplished by stretching the residual skin of the penis, but surgical methods also exist. Restoration creates a facsimile of the foreskin, but specialized tissues removed during circumcision cannot be reclaimed.  Actual regeneration of the foreskin is experimental at this time. Some forms of restoration involve only partial regeneration in instances of a high-cut wherein the circumcisee feels that the circumciser removed too much skin and that there is not enough skin for erections to be comfortable.

History 
In the Greco-Roman world intact genitals, including the foreskin, were considered a sign of beauty, civility, and masculinity.  In Classical Greek and Roman societies (8th century BC to 6th century AD), exposure of the glans was considered disgusting and improper, and did not conform to the Hellenistic ideal of gymnastic nudity. Men with short foreskins would wear the kynodesme to prevent exposure. As a consequence of this social stigma, an early form of foreskin restoration known as epispasm was practiced among some Jews in Ancient Rome (8th century BC to 5th century AD).

Foreskin restoration is of ancient origin and dates back to the reign of the Roman Emperor Tiberius (AD 14-37), when surgical means were taken to lengthen the foreskin of individuals born with either a short foreskin that did not cover the glans completely or a completely exposed glans as a result of circumcision. Again, during World War II some European Jews sought foreskin restoration to avoid Nazi persecution.

Non-surgical techniques

Tissue expansion 

Non-surgical foreskin restoration, accomplished through tissue expansion, is the more commonly used method.

Tissue expansion has long been known to stimulate mitosis, and research shows that regenerated human tissues have the attributes of the original tissue.

Methods and devices 

During restoration via tissue expansion, the remaining penile skin is pulled forward over the glans, and tension is maintained either manually or through the aid of a foreskin restoration device.

Many specialized foreskin restoration devices that grip the skin with or without tape are also commercially available. Tension from these devices may be applied by weights, elastic straps, or inflation as a means to either push the skin forward on the penis, or by a combination of these methods.

Surgical techniques

Foreskin reconstruction 
Surgical methods of foreskin restoration, known as foreskin reconstruction, usually involve a method of grafting skin onto the distal portion of the penile shaft. The grafted skin is typically taken from the scrotum, which contains the same smooth muscle (known as dartos fascia) as does the skin of the penis. One method involves a four-stage procedure in which the penile shaft is buried in the scrotum for a period of time.  Such techniques are costly, and have the potential to produce unsatisfactory results or serious complications related to the skin graft. The frenulum can also be reconstructed.

British Columbia resident Paul Tinari was held down and circumcised at the age of eight in what he stated was "a routine form of punishment" for masturbation at residential schools. Following a lawsuit Tinari's surgical foreskin restoration was covered by the British Columbia Ministry of Health. The plastic surgeon who performed the restoration was the first in Canada to have done such an operation, and used a technique similar to that described above.

Results

Time required 
The amount of time required to restore a foreskin using non-surgical methods depends on the amount of skin present at the start of the process, the subject's degree of commitment, the techniques used, the body's natural degree of plasticity, and the length of foreskin the individual desires.

The results of surgical restoration are immediate, but often described as unsatisfactory and most restoration groups advise against surgery.

Physical aspects 

Restoration creates a facsimile of the prepuce, but specialized tissues removed during circumcision cannot be reclaimed. Surgical procedures exist to reduce the size of the opening once restoration is complete (as depicted in the image above), or it can be alleviated through a longer commitment to the skin expansion regime to allow more skin to collect at the tip.

The natural foreskin is composed of smooth dartos muscle tissue (called the peripenic muscle), large blood vessels, extensive innervation, outer skin, and inner mucosa.

The natural foreskin has three principal components, in addition to blood vessels, nerves, and connective tissue: skin, which is exposed exteriorly; mucous membrane, which is the surface in contact with the glans penis when the penis is flaccid; and a band of muscle within the tip of the foreskin.  Generally, the skin grows more readily in response to stretching than does the mucous membrane. The ring of muscle which normally holds the foreskin closed is completely removed in the majority of circumcisions and cannot be regrown, so the covering resulting from stretching techniques is usually looser than that of a natural foreskin.  Nonetheless, according to some observers, it is difficult to distinguish a restored foreskin from a natural foreskin because restoration produces a "nearly normal-appearing prepuce".

The process of foreskin restoration seeks to regenerate some of the tissue removed by circumcision, as well as provide coverage of the glans.  According to research, the foreskin comprises over half of the skin and mucosa of the human penis.

In some men, foreskin restoration may alleviate certain problems they attribute to their circumcision. Such problems include prominent scarring (33%), insufficient penile skin for comfortable erection (27%), erectile curvature from uneven skin loss (16%), and pain and bleeding upon erection/manipulation (17%). The poll also asked about awareness of or involvement in foreskin restoration and included an open comment section. Many respondents and their wives "reported that restoration resolved the unnatural dryness of the circumcised penis, which caused abrasion, pain or bleeding during intercourse, and that restoration offered unique pleasures, which enhanced sexual intimacy." One man reported he had a great loss of sensation in the glans because his foreskin was not present.

Emotional, psychological and psychiatric aspects 

Foreskin restoration has been reported as having beneficial emotional results in some men, and has been proposed as a treatment for negative feelings in some adult men about their infant circumcisions that someone else decided to have performed on them.

Organizations 

Various groups have been founded since the late 20th century, especially in North America where circumcision has been routinely performed on infants. In 1989, the National Organization of Restoring Men (NORM) was founded as a non-profit support group for men undertaking foreskin restoration. In 1991, the group UNCircumcising Information and Resource Centers (UNCIRC) was formed, which was incorporated into NORM in 1994. NORM chapters have been founded throughout the United States, as well as in Canada, the United Kingdom, Australia, New Zealand, and Germany. In France, there are two associations about this. The "Association contre la Mutilation des Enfants" AME (association against child mutilation), and more recently "Droit au Corps" (right to the body).

See also 
 Circumcision controversies
 Regeneration in humans
 Restoration device
 Tissue expansion

References

Further reading 

 
  (foreword by  James L. Snyder)
 
 
 

Plastic surgery
Male genital modification
Penis
Circumcision